Katharine Faulkner "Kay" Swift (April 19, 1897 – January 28, 1993) was an American composer of popular and classical music, the first woman to score a hit musical completely. Written in 1930, the Broadway musical Fine and Dandy includes some of her best known songs; the song “Fine and Dandy” has become a jazz standard. "Can't We Be Friends?" (1929) was her biggest hit song.

Swift also arranged some of the music of George Gershwin posthumously, such as the prelude "Sleepless Night" (1946).

Biography
Katharine Faulkner Swift was born to English American Samuel Shippen Swift, a music critic, and Ellen Faulkner of England in New York City.  Her father died when she was 17. Swift was educated at the Veltin School for Girls and then trained as a classical musician and composer at the Institute of Musical Art (today the Juilliard School), where she studied piano with Bertha Tapper. Her teacher of composition was Charles Martin Loeffler, while harmony and composition were taught to her by Percy Goetschius.

Swift played professionally with the Edith Rubel Trio. While performing at a social event, she met the sister of her future husband, who arranged their meeting. James Paul "Jimmy" Warburg was a banker, member of a distinguished Jewish family who had made a fortune in banking. Swift was Christian, and Warburg's parents had accepted their marriage, but an uncle by marriage Jacob Schiff objected to it. Warburg—using the pen name of Paul James—wrote lyrics for Swift's melodies, an extension of his poetry writing which was a family tradition. Swift had three children by Warburg between 1919 and 1924. She was grandmother to the novelist Katharine Weber.

Before meeting George Gershwin in 1925, her musical background was classical, though she was a great fan of the songs of Irving Berlin. Gershwin—who had coined her nickname "Kay"— encouraged her interest in popular music and her writing in that vein. He frequently consulted Swift about his musicals and other works, and she became a trusted musical advisor.

After she met George Gershwin, he and Swift were more and more frequently seen together. Her husband Jimmy, frequently out of town on business, was tolerant, later saying that he liked Gershwin although he had some resentment toward the "self-centered genius" who had interfered with his life. Swift and Warburg's marriage ended in divorce in 1934. Gershwin and Swift's affair lasted over ten years in all, until his death in 1937. Despite their long relationship, Kay and George never married, perhaps because, as her granddaughter Katharine Weber has suggested, Gershwin's mother Rose was unhappy that she was not Jewish. In any case, his reluctance was not unfamiliar to his family and friends—Ira Gershwin thought George was too uncomfortable with children, others thought he was too self-centered to ever marry or simply preferred not to. As the couple entered a nightclub one evening, Oscar Levant reportedly announced, "Ah, look! Here comes George Gershwin with the future Miss Kay Swift."
Before their 1930 hit show Fine and Dandy, Kay Swift and Paul James contributed numbers to The First Little Show ("Can't We Be Friends?") and The Garrick Gaieties. In 1934 Swift composed a ballet for George Balanchine entitled Alma Mater, which marked Balanchine's first original work with an American setting.

After Gershwin's death in 1937, Ira Gershwin collaborated with Swift to complete and arrange some of his unpublished works. He said that she knew almost all of George's music, "had taken down sketches as he composed [...] and had total musical recall."

Swift was staff composer at Radio City Music Hall where she wrote musical numbers for The Rockettes, and was Director of Light Music for the 1939 World's Fair.

Swift met cowboy Faye Hubbard at the World's Fair rodeo, "The American Jubilee", and eloped with him two weeks later. Her 1943 book about life on his Oregon ranch, "Who Could Ask For Anything More?" was made into the 1950 movie Never a Dull Moment, which featured Fred MacMurray as the cowboy and Irene Dunne as Kay.

In 1952, Kay Swift provided the score for Cornelia Otis Skinner's one-woman Broadway show  Paris '90.

Her later years were devoted to transcribing, performing, and annotating Gershwin's music, which she did until being diagnosed with Alzheimer's disease in 1991. On January 28, 1993, she died at the Alzheimer's Resource Center in Southington, Connecticut at the age of 95.

References

Notes

External links
 KaySwift.com
 Kay Swift Papers at Irving S. Gilmore Music Library, Yale University
1923 passport photo of Kay Swift

1897 births
1993 deaths
20th-century American composers
20th-century classical composers
20th-century American women musicians
American classical composers
American women classical composers
American women songwriters
American musical theatre composers
Juilliard School alumni
Warburg family
20th-century women composers